The 2014 FIBA Africa Basketball Club Championship (29th edition), was an international basketball tournament  held in La Goulette, Tunisia from December 11 to 20, 2014. The tournament, organized by FIBA Africa and hosted by Club Africain was contested by 11 clubs split into 2 groups of six, the top four of each group qualifying for the knock-out stage, quarter, semi-finals and final.
 
Clube Recreativo Desportivo do Libolo from Angola was the winner.

Draw

 A club from Mayotte, an island off the African southeast coast under French rule

Squads

Preliminary round

Times given below are in UTC+1.

Group A

 Lost first two matches for fielding ineligible players

Group B

Knockout round

9–12th place

Quarter finals

9th place

5th-8th place

Semifinals

7th place

5th place

Bronze medal game

Gold medal game

Final standings

Recreativo do Libolo rosterAndre Owens, Benvindo Quimbamba, Eduardo Mingas, Elmer Felix, Erik Coleman, Ezequiel Silva, Filipe Abraão, Luís Costa, Manda João, Mílton Barros, Valdelício Joaquim, Vladimir Pontes, Coach: Norberto Alves

Statistical Leaders

Individual Tournament Highs

Points

Rebounds

Assists

Steals

Blocks

Turnovers

2-point field goal percentage

3-point field goal percentage

Free throw percentage

Individual Game Highs

Team Tournament Highs

Points

Rebounds

Assists

Steals

Blocks

Turnovers

2-point field goal percentage

3-point field goal percentage

Free throw percentage

Team Game highs

All Tournament Team

See also 
2013 FIBA Africa Championship

References

External links 
 FIBA Africa official website
 2014 FIBA Africa Champions Cup official website

2014 FIBA Africa Basketball Club Championship
FIBA Club Championship
FIBA Africa Basketball Club Championship
FIBA Africa Basketball Club Championship
International basketball competitions hosted by Tunisia